Peccadillo Pictures is a UK-based film producer and distributor of art house, gay and lesbian, independent and world cinema. They have provided distribution for many films such as Weekend, Tomboy, XXY, Eyes Wide Open, Four Minutes, The Blossoming of Maximo Oliveros, Transylvania, Cockles and Muscles, Summer Storm, The Guest House and Chemsex.

History

Overview
Peccadillo Pictures is a distributor of gay and lesbian, art house, and world cinema - including films from Europe, Latin America and Asia: Presque Rien and Wild Side (2004 film) both by Sèbastien Lifshitz (France), 15 by Royston Tan (Singapore), Summer Storm by Marco Kreuzpaintner (Germany), El Mar by Augusti Villaronga (Spain), A Year Without Love by Anahi Berneri (Argentina), and Blue Gate Crossing by Chih-Yen Yee (Taiwan).

In October 2006 it released Be With Me by Eric Khoo (Singapore), and in 2007, it released The Blossoming of Maximo Oliveros by Auraeus Solito (Philippines), Beyond Hatred by Olivier Meyrou (France) and Transylvania by Tony Gatlif (France) and 4:30 by Royston Tan (Singapore).

2008 saw its widest release schedule to date, with XXY by Lucia Puenzo (Argentina), Saxon by Greg Loftin (UK), Avril by Gérald Hustache-Mathieu (France) and Last of the Crazy People by Laurent Achard (France).

2009

In 2009 was released the first collection of DVD series Boys On Film.

2010

In 2010 Peccadillo Pictures will release a variety films such as Highly Strung (French title Je te mangerais) by Sophie Laloy, Give Me Your Hand (French title Donne-moi la main by Pascal-Alex Vincent), Eyes Wide Open by Haim Tabakman, and "Pornography: A Thriller" by David Kittredge as well as continuations of their short film compilations Boys on Film and Here Come the Girls including more mainstream actors such as Elliott Tittensor from Channel 4's Shameless.

2011
In 2011, the company's warehouse in Enfield was burnt down in the 2011 London riots.  All their stock/catalogue/films were destroyed.

The Boys on Film compilations

Boys on Film 1: Hard Love
The compilation showcases ten short films and documentaries that deal with all aspects of modern gay life, created by various directors from around the world. These shorts tackle a wide range of contemporary topics - the pitfalls of online cruising, long distance lovers and growing old and gay gracefully.

List of films:

 Summer - Dir. Hong Khaou
 Gay Zombie - Dir. Michael Simon
 Serene Hunter - Dir. Jason Bushman
 Le Weekend - Dir. Timothy Smith
 Cowboy Forever - Dir. Jean Baptiste Erreca
 Scarred - Dir. Damien Rea
 Packed Lunch - Dir. Tim Hunter
 Mirror, Mirror - Dir. John Winter
 VGL Hung! Dir. Max Barber

Boys on Film 2: In Too Deep
The second installment included more award-winning gay cinema: Till Kleinert’s award-winning Cowboy, Australian film Love Bites, Bramadero and Futures & Derivatives.

List of films:

 Cowboy - Dir. Till Kleinert (Germany)
 Lucky Blue - Dir. Håkon Liu (Sweden)
 Weekend In The Countryside - Dir. Mathieu Salmon (France)
 Kali Ma - Dir. Soman Chainani (USA)
 Bramadero – Dir. Julián Hernández (Mexico)
 Love Bite - Dir. Craig Boreham (Australia)
 The Island - Dir. Trevor Anderson (Canada)
 Futures & Derivatives – Dir. Arthur Halpern (USA)
 Working it Out – Dir. Tim Hunter

Boys on Film 3: American Boy
The third installment of Boys on Film features films from America including In The Closet featuring porn star turned actor Brent Corrigan.

List of films
 Dare  – Dir. Adam Salky (16mins)
 In The Closet  – Dir. Jody Wheeler (14mins)
 Area X  – Dir. Dennis Shinners (USA) 15mins
 The Young and Evil  – Dir. Julian Breece (15mins)
 Dish :)  – Dir. Brian Krinsky (15mins)
 Bugcrush – Dir. Carter Smith (36mins)
 Astoria, Queens  – Dir. Kyle Coker (22mins)

The Here Come the Girls Compilations

Here Come the Girls 1

Following the Boys on Film compilations, in 2009 Peccadillo Pictures released their first lesbian themed shorts compilation. It featured many award-winning   films from acclaimed writers/filmmakers Guinevere Turner (The L Word, Itty Bitty Titty Committee, American Psycho) and Roberta Munroe (How Not To Make A Short Film), actresses Nathalie Toriel (Finn's Girl) and Lucy Liemann (Moving Wallpaper, Reggie Perrin) and British performance artists Bird La Bird, Dyke Marilyn and Split Britches.

List of films:
 Wicked Desire - Dir. Angela Cheng (USA) 13 mins
 Below the Belt - Dir. Laurie Colbert, Dominique Cardona (Canada) 13 mins
 Congratulations Daisy Graham - Dir. Cassandra Nicolaou (Canada) 15 mins
 Dani and Alice – Dir. Roberta Munroe (USA) 11 mins
 A Soft Place – Dir. Suzanne Guacci (USA) 10 mins
 Private Life - Dir. Abbe Robinson (UK) 15 mins
 Fem - Dir. Inge ‘Campbell’ Blackman (UK) 10 mins
 Happy Birthday - Dir. Roberta Munroe (USA) 15 mins
 Late – Dir. Guinevere Turner (USA) 7 mins

References

External links 
 Official Peccadillo Pictures Website
 Peccadillo Pod Website (DVD Retail and Video On Demand)
 Peccadillo Pictures on IMDB.com

Companies established in 2000
LGBT-related film
LGBT culture in the United Kingdom
LGBT organisations in the United Kingdom
LGBT arts organizations
Film distributors of the United Kingdom